Jang, Chang and (less often) Zang are romanizations of the common Korean surname . As of the South Korean census of 2015, there were 1,021,107 people by this name in South Korea or 2.05% of the population.

Romanization
In a study by the National Institute of the Korean Language based on 2007 application data for South Korean passports, it was found that 84.5% of people with this surname spelled it in Latin letters as Jang in their passports. Another 14.9% spelled it as Chang, and 0.2% as Zhang. Rare alternative spellings included Jahng and Jean.

Distribution
During the 2000 South Korean Census, there were close to 920,000 people in South Korea– 2.1% of the general population–with this surname, most written with the hanja 張.

Jang is a relatively common surname in the United States and was listed 5,531st overall during the 2000 US Census, and 11th among Asian and Pacific Islanders in 2000. Zang was much less common and ranked 14,627th.

In China, the Chinese surnames Zhang (Hanja ), Zhang, Zhuang and Jiang use the same Chinese characters as the Korean surname Jang.

List of people with the surname

Jang
 Jang Bogo (787–846), military leader of late Silla
 Jang Song-thaek (1946–2013), North Korean government official 
 Jang Dae-Il (born 1975), former South Korean soccer player
 Jang Do-yeon (born 1985), South Korean comedian
 Jang Dong-gun (born 1972), South Korean actor and musician
 Jang Dong-yoon (born 1992), South Korean actor 
 Jang Keun-suk (born 1987), South Korean actor, singer, model, film director and DJ
 Jang Na-ra (born 1981), South Korean actress and singer
 Jang Seung-jo (born 1981), South Korean actor
 Jang Dae-hyeon (born 1997), South Korean singer, former member of boy group Rainz and member of boy group WEi
 Jang Gyu-ri (born 1997), South Korean singer and former member of Fromis 9
 Jang Hee-ryung (born 1993), South Korean actress and model
 Jang Hyuk (born 1976), South Korean actor and rapper
 Jang Hyung-Seok (born 1972), South Korean football player
 Jang Hyun-seung (born 1989), South Korean singer and member of boy band Highlight
 Jang In-hwan (1875–1930) Korean independence activist
 Jang Ye-eun (born 1998), South Korean singer and member of girl group CLC
 Jang Ja-yeon (1982–2009), South Korean actress
 Jang Jae-ho, South Korean gamer
 Jang Jeong (born 1980), South Korean golfer
 Jang Jin-young (1972–2009), South Korean actress
 Jang Joon-hwan (born 1970), South Korean film director
 Chae Jung-an (born 1977) South Korean actress
 Jang Ki-yong (born 1992), South Korean model and actor
 Jang Mi-kwan (born 1989), South Korean model and actor 
 Jang Minho (born 1977), South Korean singer
 Jang Min-hyeok (born 1978), South Korean voice actor
 Jang Nok-su (–1506), one of Yeonsangun of Joseon's concubines
 Jang Su-jeong (born 1995), South Korean tennis player
 Jang Sun-woo (born 1952), a South Korean film director
 Jang Hui-bin (1659–1701), a Joseon-era concubine, mother of Gyeongjong of Joseon
 Jang Seung-eop (1843–1897), a Joseon-era painter
 Jang Song-thaek (1946–2013), North Korean politician and four-star general
 Jang Won-young (born 2004), South Korean singer and member of girl group Ive
 Jang Woo Hyuk (born 1978), South Korean singer and rapper, member of boy band H.O.T.
 Jang Wooyoung (born 1989), South Korean singer and member of boy band 2PM
 Jang Seo-hee (born 1972), South Korean actress
 Jang Shin-young (born 1984), South Korean actress
 Jang Su-won (born 1980), South Korean actor and singer, member of boy band Sechs Kies
 Jang Yeong-sil (1390–), prominent Joseon-era scientist and astronomer
 Jang Yong-Ho (born 1976), South Korean archer
 Jang Yoon-jeong (born 1980), South Korean trot singer

Chang
 Ben Chang, character in the TV series Community
 David Chang (born 1977), American restaurateur
 Ha-Joon Chang (born 1963), economist specialising in development economics
 Hasok Chang (born 1967), historian and philosopher of science
 Chang Myon (1899–1966), second prime minister of South Korea
 Jung Koo Chang (born 1963), South Korean world boxing champion
 Chang Koehan, character in the video game series King of Fighters
 Leonard Chang, Korean-American writer
 Sarah Chang (born 1980), Korean-American violinist
 Chang Chun-ha (1918–1975) Korean independence activist, journalist and politician
 Chang Kiha (born 1982), leader of South Korean band Kiha & the Faces
 Chang So-Yun (born 1974), South Korean volleyball player
 Chang Ung (born 1938), president of the International Taekwon-Do Federation

See also

 Korean name
 List of South Korean surnames by prevalence
 Zhang (surname)
 Chang (surname)

References

Korean-language surnames